Gornje Pijavško is a village on the right bank of the Sava River in the Municipality of Krško in eastern Slovenia. The area is part of the traditional region of Lower Carniola. It is now included in the Lower Sava Statistical Region.

Name
The name of the settlement was changed from Gorenje Pijavško to Gornje Pijavško in 1990. In the past the German name was Oberpiauschko.

References

External links
Gornje Pijavško on Geopedia

Populated places in the Municipality of Krško